Malmøykalven is an island in the Oslofjord in Oslo, Norway. It has an area of 98,000 m2, and is located west of the island of Malmøya, separated from Malmøya by a narrow strait. Malmøykalven is included in the Malmøya og Malmøykalven Nature Reserve, which was established in 2008.

History
Malmøykalven was bought by the municipality of Oslo in 1915, and the site was used for a hospital for children with scrofula.

References

Islands of Oslo